Vasilev is an asteroid.

Vasilev may also refer to:
 Asparuh Vasilev (born 1981), Bulgarian footballer
 Ivan Vasilev (born 1967), Bulgarian footballer
 Milen Vasilev (born 1988), Bulgarian footballer
 Petar B. Vasilev (1918–2001), Bulgarian film director
 Petar Vasilev (footballer) (born 1983), Bulgarian footballer